Opsarius pulchellus,  is a species of fish in the family Cyprinidae, with the largest individual recorded being 11 cm long.

"Pulchellus" is a Latin diminutive meaning "beautiful".

Range 
O. pulchellus inhabits Indochina (Mekong River) and a small part of China (along the Mekong). They are mainly found in fast flowing rivers or clear hill streams.

Diet 
O. pulchellus feeds mainly on the surface of the water, feeding on dead insects that land on the surface.

Threats
O. pulchellus are rarely found in markets, but are exploited by subsistence fisheries and occasionally for the aquarium trade. Habitat degradation through sedimentation increase (e.g. by large-scale damming) may become problematic in the future, especially along the Mekong and Chao Phraya.

References

External links 
http://www.practicalfishkeeping.co.uk/content.php?sid=5194

Fish of Thailand
Opsarius
Taxa named by Hugh McCormick Smith
Fish described in 1931